Cherteqlu (also Romanized as Cherteqlū) is a village in Nazarkahrizi Rural District, Nazarkahrizi District, Hashtrud County, East Azerbaijan Province, Iran. At the 2006 census, its population was 593, in 113 families.

References 

Towns and villages in Hashtrud County